In Greek mythology, Pergamus (Ancient Greek: Πέργαμος) was the son of the warrior Neoptolemus and Andromache. It is said that Andromache returned to Asia Minor with her youngest son, Pergamus who there founded the town named after himself.

Pergamus (or Pergamos) is also the name of the citadel of Troy in Homer's Iliad.

Other uses 

Characters in Greek mythology